Meiselman is a surname. Notable people with the surname include:

Alexander Meiselman (1900–1938), Russian writer, poet, and orientalist
Avraham Elchanan Maizelman (1863-1928), Romanian Rabbi and scholar. 
David I. Meiselman (1924–2014), American economist
Moshe Meiselman (born 1942), American Orthodox rabbi
Winifred Meiselman (1934–2021), American media analyst and poet